Green bean casserole is an American baked dish consisting primarily of green beans, cream of mushroom soup, and french fried onions.

It is a popular side dish for Thanksgiving dinners in the United States and has been described as iconic. The recipe was created in 1955 by Dorcas Reilly at the Campbell Soup Company.   Campbell's estimated it was served in 20 million Thanksgiving dinners in the US each year and that 40% of the company's cream of mushroom soup sales go into a version of the dish.

Variations on the dish include broccoli casserole, using a different creamed soup variety, or using sauteed onions instead of deep-fried ones.

Background 
Campbell’s Cream of Mushroom flavored soup variety was created in 1934 and was the first of the company's soups to be marketed as a sauce as well as a soup. It became so widely used as casserole filler in recipes for the hotdish recipes popular in Minnesota that it was sometimes referred to as "Lutheran binder." Like other food companies, Campbell's employed recipe developers to create recipes using their products as part of their marketing strategy.

History of the recipe
Dorcas Reilly (1926–2018) created the recipe in 1955 while working in the home economics department at the Campbell's Soup Company. The recipe was created for a feature article for the Associated Press; the requirement was for a quick and easy dish using ingredients most US households kept on hand. 

It was called "Green Bean Bake" when the recipe began being printed on soup cans. Initially the dish did not test well within the company but, in part because of Reilly's persistence, eventually earned a reputation for being "the ultimate comfort food." Culinary historian Laura Shapiro called the recipe's use of the crunchy fried onion topping a "touch of genius" that gave an otherwise ordinary convenience-food side dish a bit of "glamour".

Food & Wine called it iconic, and Good Housekeeping said that "few dishes are as iconic" as the green bean casserole.

Popularity 
It was originally marketed as an everyday side dish but became popular for Thanksgiving dinners in the 1960s after Campbell's placed the recipe on the can's label. The recipe popularized the combination of the soup with green beans. Campbell's Soup now estimates that 40 percent of the Cream of Mushroom soup sold in the United States goes into making green bean casserole. As of 2020 Campbell's estimated it was served in 20 million Thanksgiving dinners in the US each year. Campbell's in 2020 reported their online version of the recipe is viewed 4 million times each Thanksgiving Day. According to Campbell's as of 2018, the recipe is the most popular ever developed in their kitchens.

Folklorist Lucy Long in 2007 noted that its inclusion on Thanksgiving dinner tables crosses ethnic, socioeconomic, and religious differences. She also notes it is included in most popular American cookbooks, mentioned in the media regularly, and referred to a "classic", "traditional", and "a Thanksgiving standard". She wrote that the popularity of the dish was related to its categorization as a casserole, which in the US is associated with "communal eating, sharing, and generosity" and that the green bean casserole in particular represents the familiar and also the festive.

Ingredients 
The recipe, which hasn't changed, calls for green beans, mushroom soup, milk, soy sauce, ground black pepper, and french fried onions. The beans, soup, milk, and seasonings are mixed together with a portion of the onions and baked, then topped with more onions and baked for another few minutes.   

Multiple similar recipes have been developed that "update" or "upgrade" the original recipe to use fresh beans, homemade cream sauce, and fresh mushrooms as the convenience-food based recipes of the 1950s and 1960s have become less fashionable, but according to culinary historian Shapiro, the green bean casserole remains popular for Thanksgiving for reasons of nostalgia. Other recipes have been developed, by Campbell's and others, that incorporate a variety of ingredients in addition to or in replacement of those in the original.

Creator 
In November of 2002, Reilly, representing Campbell's, donated the original recipe card to the National Inventors Hall of Fame in Akron, Ohio. The donation was followed by a meal featuring the dish. Reilly died 15 October 2018, at the age of 92 in her hometown of Camden, New Jersey.

See also

 List of casserole dishes
 Marketing

References

External links

Classic recipe at Campbells.com

Food and drink introduced in 1955
Casserole dishes
Legume dishes
Thanksgiving food
Marketing in the United States
American casseroles